South Carolina Highway 33 (SC 33) is a  state highway in the U.S. state of South Carolina. The highway connects Orangeburg with the Lone Star area, via Cameron.

Route description
SC 33 begins at an intersection with US 301/US 601/SC 4 (John C. Calhoun Drive) in Orangeburg within Orangeburg. Here, the highway continues as Andrew Dibble Street. It travels to the northeast and immediately passes Veterans Memorial Park. A few blocks later, it intersects US 178 Bus. (Broughton Street). It cuts through Memorial Park. On the southwestern corner of South Carolina State University is an intersection with US 21 Bus./US 601 (Magnolia Street). The highway travels along the southeastern edge of the university. It begins traveling along the Wilkinson Heights–Brookdale line. The highway then intersects US 21/US 178 (Chestnut Street/Whittaker Parkway). After leaving the city area, SC 33 travels through rural areas of the county, has an interchange with Interstate 26 (I-26), and passes the Bull Swamp Cemetery. Just before entering Cameron, it enters Calhoun County. In town, it intersects US 176 (Old State Road). The highway resumes a rural routing, including an intersection with SC 6, until it meets its northern terminus, an intersection with SC 267, near Lone Star.

Major intersections

History

South Carolina Highway 69

In July 1936, it was extended to SC 31 (now US 176) in Cameron. In 1938, it was decommissioned and redesignated as part of SC 33.

See also

References

External links

SC 33 - South Carolina Hwy Index

033
Transportation in Orangeburg County, South Carolina
Transportation in Calhoun County, South Carolina